is a railway station on the Ban'etsu West Line in the city of Aizuwakamatsu, Fukushima Prefecture,  Japan, operated by East Japan Railway Company (JR East).

Lines

Station layout
Higashi-Nagahara Station has a two opposed side platforms connected to the station building by a level crossing. The station is unattended.

Platforms

History
Higashi-Nagahara Station opened on December 20, 1940. The station was absorbed into the JR East network upon the privatization of the Japanese National Railways (JNR) on April 1, 1987.

Surrounding area
Higashi-Nagahara Post Office

See also
 List of railway stations in Japan

External links

 JR East Station information 

Railway stations in Fukushima Prefecture
Ban'etsu West Line
Railway stations in Japan opened in 1940
Aizuwakamatsu